Barbero is an Italian and Spanish surname. Notable people with the surname include:
Aldo Barbero (1938–2013), Argentine actor
Alessandro Barbero (born 1959), Italian historian
Andrés Barbero (1877–1951), Paraguayan physician and philanthropist
Gerardo Barbero (1961–2001), Argentine chess grandmaster
Giuseppe Barbero (born 1927), Italian economist
John Barbero (1945–2010), American public address announcer
Lori Barbero (born 1961), American rock drummer

See also
 Barbera (disambiguation)
 Barberi, a surname

Italian-language surnames
Spanish-language surnames